The FC Istiklol 2019 season was Istiklol's eleventh Tajik League season. They were defending Tajik League and Cup Champions, whilst also participating in the Tajik Supercup, AFC Champions League and AFC Cup.

Istiklol defended their Tajik League and Tajik Cup titles, whilst also winning the Tajik Supercup. In continental competitions they were knocked out of the AFC Champions League at the Preliminary round 2 stage by AGMK, and then at the group stage of the AFC Cup.

Season Events
On 3 December 2018, Khakim Fuzailov was announced as Istiklol's new manager. On 27 June, Fuzailov resigned as manager after Istiklol to progress from the group stages of the AFC Cup, with Alisher Tukhtaev being appointed as Caretaker Manager in his place.
On 2 July, Istiklol parted company with Jalil Kimsanov, Mihajlo Cakić and Ruslan Koryan by mutual consent.

On 19 July, Fatkhullo Fatkhuloev moved to Uzbekistan Super League club FK Buxoro.

On 24 July, Tabrezi Davlatmir and Ehson Panjshanbe signed new contracts with Istiklol, keeping them at the club until the end of 2020. The following day, 25 July, Bakhtior Kalandarov was released by mutual consent. On 26 July, Amirbek Juraboev left Istiklol to join Navbahor Namangan of the Uzbekistan Super League on a free transfer.

On 31 July, Istiklol announced the signings of Dzhamshed Rakhmonov, Khurshed-Timur Dzhuraev and Salam Ashurmamdov to two-year contracts.

Squad

Transfers

In

Out

Loans out

Released

Trial

Friendlies

TFF Cup

Preliminary round

Finals Group

Knockout phase

Competitions

Tajik Supercup

Tajik League

Results summary

Results by round

Results

League table

Tajik Cup

Final

AFC Champions League

Qualifying stage

AFC Cup

Group stage

Squad statistics

Appearances and goals

|-
|colspan="16"|Youth team players:
|-
|colspan="16"|Players away from Istiklol on loan:
|-
|colspan="16"|Players who left Istiklol during the season:

|}

Goal scorers

Disciplinary record

References

External links 
 FC Istiklol Official Web Site

FC Istiklol seasons
Istiklol